The 2005 season was the Denver Broncos' 36th in the National Football League (NFL) and their 46th overall. The Broncos closed out the 2005 regular season with a 13–3 record, the franchise's second-best number of wins of all time and their third best win percentage ever.  They won their first playoff game since their 1998 Super Bowl-winning season. Although they eliminated the defending back-to-back Super Bowl champion New England Patriots to end their hopes of becoming the first NFL team to three-peat, they failed to get to the Super Bowl, losing to the Pittsburgh Steelers, the eventual champions, in the AFC Championship game. The Broncos were expected by many to make the Super Bowl for the first time in the post-John Elway era. Denver would not make the postseason again until 2011 under Tim Tebow's leadership or another Conference championship until 2013, under the leadership of Peyton Manning whom the Broncos acquired in 2012.

2005 season
After losing their first game 34–10 to the Miami Dolphins on September 11, the Broncos won 5 straight games, defeating the San Diego Chargers 20–17, the Kansas City Chiefs 30–10, the Jacksonville Jaguars 20–7, the Washington Redskins 21–19, and the two-time defending champion New England Patriots 28–20 on October 16 before losing to the New York Giants on October 23 by a final score of 24–23. They then beat the defending NFC champion Philadelphia Eagles 49–21 on October 30. In that game, the Broncos became the first team in NFL history to have two players, Mike Anderson and Tatum Bell, rush for over 100 yards and another player, Jake Plummer, pass for over 300 yards in a single game.  They then beat the Oakland Raiders on November 13, 31–17. They beat the New York Jets on November 20, 27–0. It was the first time the Broncos had shut out a team at home since the Carolina Panthers on November 9, 1997.  They played the Dallas Cowboys on Thanksgiving day, November 24, winning a very hard fought game in overtime 24–21. The key play that led to Jason Elam's 24-yard game-winning field goal was a 55-yard run by Ron Dayne who filled in for the injured Tatum Bell.  They lost to the Chiefs 31–27 on December 4, but defeated the Baltimore Ravens the following week 12–10. On December 17, the Broncos defeated the Buffalo Bills 28–17. On Christmas Eve 2005, the Denver Broncos clinched the AFC West division title as they finished 8–0 at Invesco Field beating the Oakland Raiders 22–3. On December 31, 2005, the Broncos got win number 13 by going on the road and sweeping their division rivals, the Chargers, with a final score of 23–7.

The Broncos entered their third consecutive year in the playoffs with the momentum of a four-game winning streak. With a record of 13–3, they were tied with the Seattle Seahawks for second overall in the league, behind the 14–2 Indianapolis Colts. They were seeded number two in the AFC behind the Colts. On January 14, 2006, the Broncos defeated the two-time defending champions, the New England Patriots, 27–13, ending the Patriots chance of becoming the first NFL team ever to win three consecutive Super Bowl championships. The last team with a chance of winning three consecutive Super Bowls before the Patriots were the Broncos themselves. The Broncos' run came to an end by losing to the Pittsburgh Steelers in the AFC Championship 34–17 on January 22, 2006. Their strength of controlling the ball collapsed with 4 turnovers. They were outscored in the first half 24–3 and were not able to come from behind to win in the second half.  The Steelers went on to win Super Bowl XL.

Off Season
The Broncos failed to retain safety Kenoy Kennedy, who signed with the Detroit Lions, defensive end Reggie Hayward, who signed with the Jacksonville Jaguars and cornerback Kelly Herndon, who signed with the Seattle Seahawks.

During the offseason, the Broncos brought back Keith Burns and Ian Gold after one season with the Tampa Bay Buccaneers.

NFL Hall of Fame Wide Receiver Jerry Rice was suited up for the Broncos during the preseason, but ended up retiring before the season started.

NFL Draft

Coaching staff

Roster

Schedule

Standings

Playoffs

AFC Divisional Game vs New England Patriots

Despite scoring 27 points on offense, the Broncos defense was the story of the day. They forced five Patriots turnovers, including intercepting Tom Brady twice, while recovering three fumbles. A Mike Anderson one yard touchdown run in the third quarter was set up by a 100-yard interception return by Champ Bailey. It was the second longest interception return in NFL playoff history. The Patriots outgained the Broncos 420 to 286 in yardage, but the turnovers were too much for New England to overcome.

AFC Championship Game vs Pittsburgh Steelers

Team stats 
The Broncos relied on a more consistent Jake Plummer, their running game behind Tatum Bell, Ron Dayne, and Mike Anderson, and their defense to stop opposing running backs. The Broncos placed second in the league in rushing yards per game, fourth in total offense and allowed the second fewest rushing yards in the league.

The key to Denver's success that year was their ability to keep control of the ball. In the regular season they committed just 16 turnovers, tied for the second-least in the league, and took it away from their opponents 36 times, fifth-best in the league. This resulted in a turnover differential of +20, second-best in the NFL. Jake Plummer, after throwing an NFL-high-tying 20 interceptions in the 2004 season, threw only 7 interceptions on the year, and had the second-lowest interception percentage rate of any quarterback in the league (behind Brad Johnson). His only omission of a serious number of turnovers occurred, unfortunately, in the AFC Championship, with two interceptions.

In 2005 the Broncos had 5,766 total offensive yards and gave up 5,006 yards. They outrushed their opponents 2,539 to 1,363. They were, however, outpassed 3,643 to 3,227. They had 28 sacks and gave up 23. They had 46 touchdowns to their opponents' 31. They were tied for fifth in total touchdowns and were seventh in the league in points per game.

Player stats 
Jake Plummer threw 277 completions out of 456 attempts for 3366 yards and 18 touchdowns.  He had 7 interceptions and a quarterback rating of 90.2.  He also ran 46 times for 151 yards and 2 touchdowns.

Mike Anderson had 239 rushes for 1014 yards and 12 touchdowns.  Tatum Bell ran 173 times for 921 yards and 8 touchdowns.  He also had 18 catches and 104 receiving yards.  Ron Dayne had 53 carries for 270 yards.  He also had 18 receptions for 212 yards.

Rod Smith led in receiving with 85 receptions for 1105 yards and 6 touchdowns.  Ashley Lelie had 42 receptions, 770 yards, and 1 touchdown. Jeb Putzier made 37 catches for 481 yards. Charlie Adams had 21 receptions and 203 yards.

Ian Gold had 72 tackles, 16 assists, 3 sacks and 2 fumble recoveries. Nick Ferguson made 61 tackles and had 18 assists and 1 fumble recovery. Al Wilson had 61 tackles, 11 assists, 3 sacks and 1 fumble recovery. Domonique Foxworth made 64 tackles, had 6 assists and 2 fumble recoveries. Champ Bailey had 8 interceptions and 2 touchdowns, 59 tackles and 5 assists. John Lynch had 44 tackles, 17 assists, and 4 sacks.

Jason Elam kicked 24 field goals out of 32 attempted and 43 out of 44 extra points.

References

External links
NFL.com Stats, Pro Football Reference Stats

Denver Broncos
Denver Broncos seasons
AFC West championship seasons
Denver Broncos